Eileen Hogan (born 1946) is a painter, who has shown in museums and private galleries in the UK and America. Her retrospective exhibition at the Yale Center for British Art in New Haven, USA in 2019, accompanied by a book published by Yale University Press, focused particularly on two dominant themes – enclosed gardens and portraiture. She is a professor at the University of the Arts London, a trustee of the Royal Drawing School, and an ambassador for the Salveson Mindroom Centre, a Scottish charity. She lives and works in London.

Education 
Eileen Hogan studied at Camberwell School of Arts and Crafts, the Royal Academy Schools, Royal College of Art and the British School at Athens.

Work 
Through painterly analysis Hogan explores the importance of green spaces in an urban environment. She investigates an expanded notion of what gardens are, their dynamics, the way that they are used, the patterns of life they generate and their impact on health. Hogan has used painting to sustain a visual reflection on biography, self-image, trace and informality in portraiture. Collaborating with an oral history charity, National Life Stories, at the British Library, she worked with an oral historian to establish the impact that a detailed narration of a life story might have on a sitter's presence. She expanded on this when she was one of five artists invited by Tate Research to each construct a filmed life class at Tate Modern (one thread of the Leverhulme-funded Tate research project: Art School Educated). Hogan's film explored the way that stories underlie how we see the world and it was shown in the Tate Britain Display – Reception, Rupture and Return: The Model and the Life Room in 2015. Her 'conversation' with Alan Rusbridger in 2021, after being commissioned to paint his portrait for Lady Margaret Hall, describes her process of painting Rusbridger during a very volatile period of history (2019–21).

Selected solo exhibitions 
 Eileen Hogan: Personal Geographies Yale Centre for British Art US 2019
 Personal Georgraphies Browse & Darby London 2019
 Artists-Not-In-Residence The Garden Museum London 2018
 Edges and Enclosurers Browse & Darby London 2015
 Vacant Possession New Art Centre, Roche Court, Salisbury 2013
 Eileen Hogan at Little Sparta, The Fleming Collection London and the Stockwood Discovery Centre Luton Museums 2013

External links 
 'In Conversation with Alan Rusbridger"
 Personal Geographies streamed lecture by Hogan 8 May 2019 Yale Center for British Art
 The Spectator 9 November 2019, p 36 Books of the Year, Craig Raine
 Artist in Focus: Eileen Hogan, lecture by Todd Longstaffe-Gowan, Paul Mellon Centre London 25 October 2018
 British Artist Explores Poetry of Light in Enclosed Space, New York Times 2013
 Life Drawing with Eileen Hogan Master Class Tate Modern 2013

1946 births
Living people
Painters from London
English women painters
English portrait painters
Alumni of Camberwell College of Arts
Alumni of the Royal College of Art
Artists commissioned by the Imperial War Museum
Academics of Camberwell College of Arts
21st-century British women artists
21st-century English women
21st-century English people